Tokmak is a city in Polohy Raion in the Zaporizhzhia Oblast (province) of south-central Ukraine. The city stands on the River Tokmachka, a tributary of the River Tokmak. Prior to 2020, it served as the administrative center of the Tokmak Raion (district). Its population is approximately

History 
On 7 March 2022, Tokmak was captured by Russian forces during the 2022 Russian invasion of Ukraine. Citizens repeatedly went to rallies against the occupation of the Russian military.

On May 7, it became known about the death of the mayor of Tokmak (since 2009) Ihor Kotelevskyi, who refused to cooperate with the Russians who attacked Ukraine.

Tokmak has a large solar energy station with a 50 MW capacity.

Notable people 
 Lew Grade (1906–1998), Ukrainian-British media mogul (born in Tokmak)
 Bernard Delfont (1909–1994), Ukrainian-British theatre impresario (born in Tokmak)
 Andriy Oberemko (born 1984), Ukrainian professional footballer

Gallery

References

External links 

 Tokmak city site
 Tokmak District Museum of Local Lore

Cities in Zaporizhzhia Oblast
Polohy Raion
Berdyansky Uyezd
Shtetls
Cities of regional significance in Ukraine
Populated places established in the Russian Empire